Newlands of Geise is a  scattered hamlet. It lies to the south west of Thurso in Caithness in the Scottish Highlands and is in the Scottish council area of Highland.

References

Populated places in Caithness